

Astronomy
 Cassini–Huygens, mission to Saturn and Titan
 Huygens (spacecraft), the probe of the Cassini-Huygens mission which landed on Saturn's moon Titan in 2005
 2801 Huygens, an asteroid 
 Huygens (crater), martian crater
 Mons Huygens, a mountain of Earth's Moon
 Huygens Gap, in the rings of Saturn

Physics
 Huygens law; see one of: 
Huygens law (pendulums) 
Huygens law 
 Huygens–Steiner theorem

Optics
 Huygens–Fresnel principle
 Huygens' principle, see Huygens–Fresnel principle
 Huygens eyepiece, first compound eye piece
 Huygens Software, a microscope image processing package

Mathematics and games
 Huygens lemniscate, a figure eight curve
 König–Huygens formula, see Steiner–Huygens

Other
Huygens-Fokker Foundation
 Huygens' tritone, a musical interval
 Huygens' engine
 Christiaan Huygens College, High School in Eindhoven, Netherlands.
Huygens College, High School in Heerhugowaard, Netherlands.
 The Christiaan Huygens, a ship of the Nederland Line.
 Huygens Scholarship Programme for international students and Dutch students
 W.I.S.V. Christiaan Huygens: Dutch study guild for the studies Mathematics and Computer Science at the Delft University of Technology
 Huygens Laboratory: Home of the Physics department at Leiden University
 Huygens Supercomputer: at SARA, Amsterdam
 The Huygens-building in Noordwijk, Netherlands
 The Huygens-building at the Radboud University, Nijmegen, The Netherlands.

Christiaan Huygens
Huygens
Huygens